Fabrice Elysée Kouadio Kouakou (born 3 October 1990), commonly known as Manucho, is an Ivorian professional footballer who plays for Al-Orouba SC as a forward.

Club career
Manucho started his career in the youth ranks of Stella Club d'Adjamé and Ocaf FC, before moving to Estonian clubs Nõmme Kalju FC and Lootus Kohtla Järve and then FC Infonet.

In 2012, he received an award as the season's lead scorer and best player, after scoring 31 goals that year with FC Infonet in the Meistriliiga, Estonia's top level league.

In 2014, he scored 30 goals in 31 games while playing for FC Infonet. This placed him as the third top scorer in the Meistriliiga, also as first African scorer, and as the twentieth top scorer worldwide for that year. As far as scoring average, he ranked fourth worldwide in 2014 with 0.97 goals per game.

On 7 January 2015, Manucho joined Algerian club USM Alger, signing a two and a half year contract with the club.

On 9 December 2019, FCI Levadia Tallinn confirmed that Manucho had joined the club on a contract until the end of 2020.

Career statistics

Club

References

External links
 

Living people
1990 births
Ivorian footballers
Association football forwards
People from Bouaké
FCI Tallinn players
Nõmme Kalju FC players
FC Lootus Kohtla-Järve players
USM Alger players
RC Relizane players
CS Constantine players
Al Ittihad Alexandria Club players
Baniyas Club players
CS Sfaxien players
FK Liepāja players
FCI Levadia Tallinn players
Al-Kawkab FC players
Al Jazirah Al Hamra Club players
Esiliiga players
Meistriliiga players
Algerian Ligue Professionnelle 1 players
Tunisian Ligue Professionnelle 1 players
Latvian Higher League players
Egyptian Premier League players
UAE First Division League players
Saudi First Division League players
Ivorian expatriate sportspeople in Nigeria
Ivorian expatriate sportspeople in Algeria
Ivorian expatriate sportspeople in Egypt
Ivorian expatriate sportspeople in the United Arab Emirates
Ivorian expatriate sportspeople in Tunisia
Ivorian expatriate sportspeople in Latvia
Ivorian expatriate sportspeople in Saudi Arabia
Expatriate footballers in Nigeria
Expatriate footballers in Estonia
Expatriate footballers in Algeria
Expatriate footballers in Egypt
Expatriate footballers in the United Arab Emirates
Expatriate footballers in Tunisia
Expatriate footballers in Latvia
Expatriate footballers in Saudi Arabia
Ivorian expatriate sportspeople in Estonia